Hinova is a commune located in Mehedinți County, Oltenia, Romania. It is composed of four villages: Bistrița, Cârjei, Hinova and Ostrovu Corbului.

References

Communes in Mehedinți County
Localities in Oltenia